Nahal Oren is an archaeological site on the northern bank of the wadi of Nahal Oren (Hebrew)/Wadi Fallah (Arabic) on Mount Carmel,  south of Haifa, Israel. The site comprises a cave and the small terrace in front of it, which steeply descends towards the wadi floor. The site was first excavated in 1941. Kebaran (Upper Paleolithic), Natufian (Epipaleolithic) and Pre-Pottery Neolithic A and B (PPNA, PPNB) industries were found.

Upper Paleolithic

Grain
Wheat was recovered from the Nahal Oren site, but it was not certain whether it was cultivated or wild. Grain was relatively rare at the site in comparison with other food resources. The age of the emmer wheat grains found there is an indication that the cultivation of grain might have started as early as 16,000 years ago. In 1985 the three spikelets of cultivated emmer found in a Kebaran context in Wadi Oren were seen to be so early as to be considered an anomaly.

Neolithic village
A PPNA village of some 13 subcircular houses and other structures stood on four artificial, closely set terraces. The buildings were similar to those of PPNA Jericho.

Only one human burial was discovered at the PPNA village site. There were no grave goods in the burial pit, and the skeleton was complete with the exception of the skull, which had been removed - an early example of a practice better known from the later Neolithic.

The remains of the PPNB village are far more scarce, but seem to be in continuation of the PPNA phase.

Domestication of gazelles and goats
During Neolithic occupation, the main source of food at the site appears to have been gazelles, and judging from the high incidence of immature gazelle bones, these animals were domesticated. The later shift to goat husbandry may have occurred because goats are less selective in their diets than gazelles, and can graze in areas where the gazelle would not fare well.

Repeated occupation
Nahal Oren was occupied repeatedly over thousands of years by culture after culture, which means that it was a preferred site for occupation, rather than an occasional one.

External links
 Israel Museum, Jerusalem. Items found at Nahal Oren
 Bible Walks, Oren Caves; non-academic, with many photos and useful information

See also

 Ohalo II, a Kebaran (Upper Paleolithic) site at the Sea of Galilee containing the earliest identification of emmer wheats

References

1941 archaeological discoveries
Natufian sites
Prehistoric sites in Israel
Pre-Pottery Neolithic A
Pre-Pottery Neolithic B
Mount Carmel
Kebaran culture